State Route 153 (SR 153) is a  long east–west state highway in the northeastern portion of the U.S. state of Ohio. The western terminus of SR 153 is at a signalized intersection with southbound SR 43 in Canton, along a stretch of SR 43 where that highway is divided into a one-way couplet.

Route description
All of SR 153 is situated within the eastern half of Stark County.  No part of this state highway is included as a part of the National Highway System (NHS).  The NHS is a network of routes determined to be most important for the economy, mobility and defense of the nation.

History
The SR 153 designation was established in 1932.  Its original routing consisted of the portion of the existing alignment of SR 153 between its western terminus at SR 43 in Canton and its junction with SR 44 in Louisville.  SR 153 replaced what was a portion of SR 44 before that highway was re-routed to continue due south from Louisville toward East Canton.  In 1937, SR 153 was extended east from Louisville to its present eastern terminus at SR 183, which at the time carried the SR 80 designation.  The extension utilized a county-maintained roadway.

Major intersections

References

153
Transportation in Stark County, Ohio